Chur Wiesental railway station is a railway station in the northern part of the town of Chur, the capital of the Swiss canton of Grisons. The station is on the Rhaetian Railway's single-track  Landquart–Thusis line, and has one side platform. The two-track SBB line runs parallel but has no intermediate stops between Chur and Landquart.

Services
Chur Wiesental is served by regional trains and the S1 of the Chur S-Bahn:

 RegioExpress: hourly service between Disentis/Mustér and Scuol-Tarasp.
 Regio: limited service between Disentis/Mustér and Scuol-Tarasp.
 Chur S-Bahn : hourly service between Rhäzüns and Schiers.

References

External links
 
 

Railway stations in Graubünden
Rhaetian Railway stations
Transport in Chur